Ten referendums were held in Switzerland in 1976. The first two were held on 21 March on popular initiatives "for employees' participation" (with a counter-proposal; both were rejected), and "for taxation reform" (also rejected). The next three were held on 13 June on a federal law on spatial planning (rejected), a CHF 200 million loan to the International Development Association (rejected), and renewing unemployment insurance (approved).

Two referendums were held on 26 September on an amendment to the Swiss Federal Constitution on broadcasting (rejected) and a popular initiative "for liability insurance by the union for motor vehicles and bicycless" (rejected). The final three referendums were held on 5 December on monetary policy (approved), price monitoring (approved) and a popular initiative to introduce a 40-hour working week (rejected).

Results

March: Employees' participation

March: Taxation reform

June: Spatial planning

June: General tariff

June: Unemployment insurance

September: Constitutional amendment on broadcasting

September: Liability insurance

December: Monetary policy

December: Price monitoring

December: 40-hour working week

References

1976 referendums
1976 in Switzerland
Referendums in Switzerland